The Chrysler Falcon is a two-seat roadster concept car commissioned by Chrysler and built by Carrozzeria Ghia for the 1955 model year. The car was never put into production, but some of its features reappeared on later Chrysler designs.

History
Automobile designer Virgil Exner left Studebaker to join Chrysler in 1949. Chrysler's previous designers favored conservative, upright bodystyles, but sales were declining. Exner was personally recruited to become head of Chrysler's Advanced Styling Studio by Kauffman Thuma (K.T.) Keller, who was first President, then Chairman of the Board of Chrysler, to overcome Chrysler's reputation for uninspiring design, and to spur sales.

Exner commissioned a range of what he called "Idea cars" to explore new design concepts. Most of these cars were built in Italy by Ghia. Among them were several sporty, open-top, two-seat cars, including the 1955 Chrysler Falcon. The Falcon is often described as Chrysler's answer to the Ford Thunderbird and Chevrolet Corvette.

Much of the actual design of the Falcon is credited to Maurice Baldwin.

The Chrysler Falcon debuted on 17 August 1955 at the Chrysler International Salon, alongside the Flight Sweep I and Flight Sweep II.

The Falcon incorporated many parts and assemblies from existing Chrysler products, and could be built with production methods already in place. The cars that were built were considered pre-production examples, with the expectation that the Falcon would go into full production. Ultimately, Chrysler's Engineering staff scuttled these plans.

A Chrysler Falcon is reported to have been shipped back to Ghia in Italy, and from there to South America. A Chrysler Falcon was offered as the prize in a 1955 fundraiser for the Venezuelan Red Cross. The car was made available through the sponsorship of "C.A. El Automóvil Universal de Occidente", the official Chrysler representative in Venezuela at the time. By the middle of the 1970s the car had been returned to North America, and was owned by Paul Stern. After a few more changes of ownership, in the late 1980s it became part of the collection of owner Joe Bortz.

Moving on from the Idea Cars, Exner's influence reached Chrysler's production lineup with the debut of the Forward Look models in 1955 and the major restyling of the lineup in 1957.

Some of the Falcon's styling elements would be used in other Chrysler designs. The Falcon's egg-crate grille later appeared on the 1957–59 Chrysler 300. Its exposed side exhaust pipes appeared on the 1960 Plymouth XNR, but only on the driver's side of this Slant-6 powered concept, and then again many years later on the 1992 Dodge Viper. The Falcon is in fact referred to as "Exner's Viper" by Daimler-Chrysler.

Years later Chrysler planned to reuse the Falcon name for their new-for-1960 Plymouth Valiant compact, but it was the Ford Motor Company who released the Ford Falcon production car with the name. There are two explanations for the change. One holds that Henry Ford II asked Chrysler for permission to use the name, which Chrysler gave. The other says that Ford registered the name before Chrysler was able to, forcing Chrysler to scramble for a new name for their own car by sponsoring a contest among their employees.

Number built

For some time it was believed that only one Chrysler Falcon was built. It is now generally accepted that at least two Falcons were completed. This is in part based on observed differences in the bodies of cars in original photos of the Falcon.

The first car built was painted black, and was used by Exner as his personal vehicle. Exner also drove the car in some SCCA events. The fate of this car is currently unknown, but there is no record of it having been destroyed.

Some references suggest that as many as three cars were built. This is based on the existence of a letter from Ghia designer Luigi Segre that refers to three cars: one described as a “DeSoto Sports Roadster” (Model A-489), and the others as Chrysler Sports Roadsters (Model A-488).

Features
The Chrysler Falcon is built on a unitary chassis. It is a modified version of the Chrysler C-300 platform.

Two different models of Chrysler's first generation "Double rocker" Hemi V8 were used in the cars. One was the Chrysler FirePower V8 that displaced , while the other was the DeSoto FireDome V8 that displaced . The Bortz car has its original 331 cubic inch FirePower V8.

The transmission is a 2-speed PowerFlite automatic. It is controlled by a floor-mounted lever on the interior. Other interior features include leather upholstery, an adjustable split-bench seat, concave inner door panels, power windows, and a wooden steering wheel by Nardi.

The brakes are drums at all wheels, and are power assisted, as is the steering.

Technical data

References

Further reading

External links

 
 
 

Falcon
Cars introduced in 1955
Convertibles